The Ashokan Reservoir (Iroquois for "place of fish") is a reservoir in Ulster County, New York. It is at the eastern end of the Catskill Park, and is one of several in the region created to provide the City of New York with water. It is the city's deepest reservoir at  near the dam at the former site of Bishop Falls.

History

New York City turned to the Catskills for water in the early 20th century after discovering that a group of speculators calling itself the Ramapo Water Company had bought up riparian rights to many water sources further south in Rockland, Orange and Ulster counties. The Catskills were more desirable, as state-owned Forest Preserve land in the region could not, under the state constitution, be sold to any other party. A recent amendment to that section of the state constitution also allowed up to 3 percent of the total Forest Preserve land to be flooded for reservoirs.

In 1905 the New York State Legislature enacted legislation that created the New York City Board of Water Supply and allowed the city to acquire lands and build dams, reservoirs and aqueducts in the Catskills.

Local opponents of the reservoir cast doubt on its soundness, saying it could never hold enough water (it would be one of the largest reservoirs in the world at the time), but when it was filled from 1912 to 1914, they were silenced. Residents of the area to be flooded did not take kindly to the idea, and fought eminent domain proceedings bitterly. They were aided by local lawyers familiar with the checkered history of Catskill land claims. It would be 1940 before the last were settled.

The Ashokan Reservoir was constructed between 1907 and 1915, by the New York City Board of Water Supply, by impounding the Esopus Creek. Thousands of acres of farmland were submerged. The impoundment covered twelve communities located in a valley where farming, logging, and quarrying prevailed. Approximately two thousand residents along with roads, homes, shops, farms, churches, and mills were either moved or abandoned, but most of them were torn down. According to Bob Steuding, a humanities professor at Ulster County Community College in Stone Ridge, the area that became the West Basin of the reservoir contained 504 dwellings, nine blacksmith shops, 35 stores, 10 churches, 10 schools, seven sawmills and a gristmill. Several of these communities were re-established in nearby locations. Nearly 12-and-a-half miles (20 km) of a local railroad line (the Ulster and Delaware Railroad) was moved and cemeteries were relocated.

The dam was constructed mainly by local laborers, as well as African-Americans and Italian immigrants, who also did the job of razing most of the trees and buildings in the area. Fights would often break out in the labor camps where the crews would eat and sleep, so a police force, which would later become the New York City Department of Environmental Protection (NYCDEP) Police, was established to keep peace in the camps. The dam was constructed with Rosendale cement, which at the time was the world's strongest cement. When the dam was completed, giant steam whistles blew for one hour, signaling to people in the valley to evacuate immediately.

Some relocated communities survive along the reservoir's banks, such as West Shokan, Olivebridge, Ashokan and Shokan. Most, however, such as Brown's Station, are remembered in historical markers along routes 28 and 28A.

Statistics
The resulting body of water is the oldest New York City–owned reservoir in the Catskill Mountains, being placed into service as long ago as 1915. The reservoir is one of NYC's largest according to its surface area and volume. At full capacity, the reservoir can hold  of water, has a 255-square-mile (408 km2) drainage basin, and is over 180 feet (54.9 m) deep at its deepest point, making it the city's deepest reservoir.

The reservoir is encircled by Routes 28 and 28A, along with many relocated villages. It is separated into two basins by Reservoir Rd., which has a causeway that runs over the middle of it. Water does not pass freely between the two basins, and the eastern basin, which borders the relocated villages of Ashokan, Glenford, and West Hurley, along with the non-relocated village of Stony Hollow, is seven inches lower than the western basin. The western basin borders the relocated villages of Boiceville, Brodhead, Olive, Olivebridge, Shokan, and West Shokan. There is also an abandoned road that runs along the spillway of the reservoir, where water runs back into the Esopus Creek by Olivebridge.

Some of this water comes from the Schoharie Reservoir via the 16 mile (25.6 kilometre) Shandaken Tunnel, which empties into the Esopus Creek. It also gets water from said creek and its many tributaries. It flows another  to the Ashokan Reservoir. The water then flows into Olivebridge, New York to enter the  Catskill Aqueduct. It flows into the Kensico Reservoir, just north of White Plains, to mix with water from the Delaware Aqueduct. The water flows a few more miles into the Hillview Reservoir in Yonkers, the main collecting point for the water.

Permitted activities
Due to the need to ensure the safety of the water system, and to make sure the nearly century-old dams stay intact, only limited activities are permitted around the reservoir property, including fishing and logging. A special license is required for such activities. For instance, to go boating or fishing, a public access permit is needed that was issued after 2002. Otherwise, it is no longer valid.

Also, such activities as swimming and diving are strictly prohibited. This is in order to make sure the water stays as clean as possible. It is also illegal to bring gasoline-powered motorcraft into the reservoir. This is in case gasoline leaks into the water and pollutes it. Pine and spruce trees were planted around the banks at the time of dam and lake construction to prevent erosion.  It was also believed by engineers of the time that broad-leaved deciduous trees polluted the water with nutrients more so than conifers.

After the September 11, 2001 terrorist attacks, the city and state decided to permanently close the spillway road to vehicular traffic as a security precaution. This has added a great deal more traveling time and distance for those on the south side of the reservoir to reach locations to the north. The city compensates the local school district for the extra fuel costs its buses have incurred. The Reservoir Road causeway, however, is still open.

See also

List of reservoirs and dams in New York
Ashokan Farewell
Ashokan Center

References

Further reading

External links 
 
 Deepwater, a documentary about the reservoir
  NYCDEP Recreational Use Permit Application 
 

Reservoirs in Ulster County, New York
Catskill/Delaware watersheds
Catskill Park
1915 establishments in New York (state)